Wessington House is a historic home located at Edenton, Chowan County, North Carolina. It was built about 1851, and is a 3-story house with a full English basement, brick dwelling with a center hall plan.  The front facade features a two-tiered full-length porch with elaborate iron railings and balustrade.

It was listed on the National Register of Historic Places in 1973.

References

External links

Historic American Buildings Survey in North Carolina
Houses on the National Register of Historic Places in North Carolina
Houses completed in 1851
Houses in Chowan County, North Carolina
National Register of Historic Places in Chowan County, North Carolina
1851 establishments in North Carolina